Avan Pithana? is a 1966 Indian Tamil-language comedy drama film directed by P. Neelakantan, produced by P. Angamuthu and written by M. Karunanidhi. It is a remake of the Telugu film Dagudu Moothalu (1964). The film stars S. S. Rajendran, C. R. Vijayakumari, S. V. Sahasranamam, T. S. Balaiah and T. P. Muthulakshmi. It was released on 29 April 1966.

Plot 

Nallaiah, a wealthy industrialist, disowns his son after learning of the latter's desire to marry an impoverished woman. The son and wife die separately, leaving their son Kumar destitute. A couple running a tea shop adopt Kumar and raise him as their own. One day, a young woman named Gomathi runs into the shop after being chased by a man. Kumar gives her shelter, and some time later, takes her to Nallaiah to be his nurse. Kumar is not aware that he is Nallaiah's grandson. Nallaiah is ill and shows regret over his decision to disown his son. Gomathi wins Nallaiah's trust and is given the keys to his safe. When Nallaiah dies, this leads to a war for the property he has left behind. A group of miscreants forge Nallaiah's will by adding their own names to it. However, Kumar arrives and wins his claim to the inheritance after proving that he is Nallaiah's grandson.

Cast 
 S. S. Rajendran as Kumar
 C. R. Vijayakumari as Gomathi
 S. V. Sahasranamam as Nallaiah
 T. S. Balaiah and T. P. Muthulakshmi as miscreants
 Nagesh as Chinnaya
 Sachu as Sasi
 Udaya Chandrika
 A. Karunanidhi
 Pakoda Kadhar

Production 
Avan Pithana? was directed by P. Neelakantan and produced by R. Periyanayagam, S. P. Karupaiah and P. Angamuthu under Umayal Productions. It was remade from the Telugu film Dagudu Moothalu (1964), with M. Karunanidhi writing the remake, while T. M. Sundara Babu handled the cinematography.

Soundtrack 
The soundtrack was composed by R. Parthasarathi.

Release and reception 
Avan Pithana? was released on 29 April 1966. Kalki praised it for the performances of Rajendran, Vijayakumari and Balaiah, but felt Nagesh could have been better utilised.

References

External links 
 

1960s Tamil-language films
1966 comedy-drama films
1966 films
Films directed by P. Neelakantan
Films with screenplays by M. Karunanidhi
Indian comedy-drama films
Tamil remakes of Telugu films